Dash Qayah Bashi (also Romanized as Dāsh Qayah Bāshī; also known as Dāsh Bāshi) is a village in Mulan Rural District, in the Central District of Kaleybar County, East Azerbaijan Province, Iran. At the 2006 census, its population was 64, in 10 families.

References 

Populated places in Kaleybar County